Ewa Hedkvist Petersen (born 15 January 1952 in Arvidsjaur, Norrbotten) is a Swedish politician representing the Social Democratic Workers' Party of Sweden. She was a Member of the Riksdag between 1985 and 1994, and a Member of the European Parliament from 1999 to 2007. As a MEP she sat on the Committee on Transport and Tourism.

Career

 Degree in social studies (1974)
 School welfare officer (1974–1979)
 Social welfare secretary (1979–1983)
 Family law secretary (1983–1994)
 Chief education officer (1994–1998)
 Assistant project leader (1998–1999)
 Social welfare secretary (1983–1994), chief education officer (1994–1998), assistant project leader (1998–1999)
 Family law secretary (1983–1994)
 Chief Education Officer (1994–1998)
 Assistant project leader (1998–1999)
 Member of Norrbotten county council (since 1998)
 Chairwoman of the Norrbotten county education board (1987–1992), Member of the Swedish Parliament (1985–1994)
 second Vice-Chairwoman of the Social Democratic group in the Swedish Parliament (1991–1994)
 Government-appointed leader of the inquiry into the establishment of a Children's Rights Ombudsman (1991)
 Chairwoman of the State Committee on Child Abuse (since 1999)
 Member of the Council, Technical University of Luleå (1988–1997)
 Chairman of Filmpool Nord (since 1992), Vice-Chairman of the board of the Swedish Film Institute (1995–1999)
 Member of the European Parliament 1999-2007

References

External links
 Official website
 European Parliament biography
 

1952 births
Living people
People from Arvidsjaur Municipality
Swedish Social Democratic Party MEPs
MEPs for Sweden 1999–2004
MEPs for Sweden 2004–2009
20th-century women MEPs for Sweden
21st-century women MEPs for Sweden